Chlorophorus is a genus of round-necked longhorn beetles belonging to the family Cerambycidae, subfamily Cerambycinae.

Species
Species within this genus include:

 Chlorophorus abnepos Viktora, 2020
 Chlorophorus abruptulus Holzschuh, 1992
 Chlorophorus abyssinicus Aurivillius, 1921
 Chlorophorus acrocarpi Gardner, 1942
 Chlorophorus adelii Holzschuh, 1974
 Chlorophorus adlbaueri Dauber, 2002
 Chlorophorus adventicus Holzschuh, 2017
 Chlorophorus aegyptiacus (Fabricius, 1775)
 Chlorophorus agnatus Chevrolat, 1863
 Chlorophorus albopunctatus (Pic, 1916)
 Chlorophorus alboscutellatus Chevrolat, 1863
 Chlorophorus alfredpuchneri Schmid, 2014
 Chlorophorus alni Holzschuh, 1982
 Chlorophorus amami Hayashi, 1968
 Chlorophorus amoenus Laporte & Gory, 1836
 Chlorophorus ancora (Jordan, 1903)
 Chlorophorus angustulus (Macleay, 1886)
 Chlorophorus annamensis Pic, 1953
 Chlorophorus annularis (Fabricius, 1787)
 Chlorophorus annularoides Holzschuh, 1983
 Chlorophorus annulatus (Hope, 1831)
 Chlorophorus anticeconjunctus Pic, 1943
 Chlorophorus anticemaculata Schwarzer, 1925
 Chlorophorus anulifer Heller, 1926
 Chlorophorus apertulus Holzschuh, 1992
 Chlorophorus arciferus (Chevrolat, 1863)
 Chlorophorus arfakensis Viktora, 2019
 Chlorophorus aritai (Ohbayashi, 1964)
 Chlorophorus assimilis (Hope, 1931)
 Chlorophorus audax Viktora, 2019
 Chlorophorus aurantiacus Aurivillius, 1911
 Chlorophorus aurivillianus Plavilstshikov, 1921
 Chlorophorus aurivilliusi Schwarzer, 1926
 Chlorophorus austerus (Chevrolat, 1863)
 Chlorophorus bakeri Aurivillius, 1922
 Chlorophorus basilanus Heller, 1926
 Chlorophorus basispilus (Jordan, 1903)
 Chlorophorus belum Viktora, 2019
 Chlorophorus biinterruptus Pic, 1943
 Chlorophorus bonengensis Gressitt & Rondon, 1970
 Chlorophorus boninensis Kano, 1933
 Chlorophorus borneensis Fisher, 1935
 Chlorophorus brevenotatus Pic, 1922
 Chlorophorus butleri Pic, 1920
 Chlorophorus capensis (Castelnau & Gory, 1836)
 Chlorophorus capillatus Holzschuh, 2006
 Chlorophorus caragana Xie & Wang, 2012
 Chlorophorus carinatus Aurivillius 1913
 Chlorophorus castaneorufus Fairmaire, 1895
 Chlorophorus chiue Nakamura, 1974
 Chlorophorus cingalensis (Gahan, 1906)
 Chlorophorus circularis Holzschuh, 2003
 Chlorophorus clemenceaui Pic, 1918
 Chlorophorus congruus Holzschuh 2003
 Chlorophorus coniperda Holzschuh, 1992
 Chlorophorus convexifrons Holzschuh, 1981
 Chlorophorus copiosus Holzschuh, 1991
 Chlorophorus coruscus Holzschuh, 2017
 Chlorophorus crassipes Pesarini & Sabbadini 2015
 Chlorophorus cursor Rapuzzi & Sama, 1999
 Chlorophorus curvatofasciatus Aurivillius, 1922
 Chlorophorus dahanshanus Niisato & Chou, 2017
 Chlorophorus damascenus (Chevrolat, 1854)
 Chlorophorus decoratus (Pascoe, 1869)
 Chlorophorus deterrens Pascoe, 1862
 Chlorophorus dimidiatus Aurivillius, 1922
 Chlorophorus dinae Rapuzzi & Sama, 1999
 Chlorophorus distiguendus Perroud, 1855
 Chlorophorus diversicolor Holzschuh, 2016
 Chlorophorus dodsi Peringuey, 1908
 Chlorophorus dohertii Gahan, 1906
 Chlorophorus dominator Viktora, 2019
 Chlorophorus dominici Sama, 1996
 Chlorophorus douei (Chevrolat, 1863)
 Chlorophorus drouini Viktora, 2019
 Chlorophorus drumonti Dauber, 2004
 Chlorophorus duo (Fairmaire, 1888)
 Chlorophorus dureli Pic, 1950
 Chlorophorus durvillei (Laporte & Gory, 1841)
 Chlorophorus eckweileri Holzschuh, 1992
 Chlorophorus elaeagni Plavilstshikov 1956
 Chlorophorus eleodes (Fairmaire, 1889)
 Chlorophorus emili Viktora, 2021
 Chlorophorus eximius Aurivillius, 1911
 Chlorophorus exploratus Viktora, 2019
 Chlorophorus externenotatus Pic, 1925
 Chlorophorus externesignatus Pic, 1936
 Chlorophorus faldermanni (Faldermann, 1837)
 Chlorophorus favieri (Fairmaire, 1873)
 Chlorophorus fictus Viktora, 2019
 Chlorophorus flavopubescens Hayashi, 1968
 Chlorophorus fraternus Holzschuh, 1992
 Chlorophorus fristedti (Aurivillius, 1893)
 Chlorophorus funebris Gressitt & Rondon, 1970
 Chlorophorus furcillatus Holzschuh, 1989
 Chlorophorus furtivus Gressitt & Rondon, 1970
 Chlorophorus gaudens Holzschuh, 1992
 Chlorophorus glaucus (Fabricius, 1781)
 Chlorophorus golestanicus Vorisek, 2011
 Chlorophorus grandipes Pic, 1943
 Chlorophorus graphus Holzschuh, 1998
 Chlorophorus gratiosus (Marseul, 1868)
 Chlorophorus griseomaculatus Pic, 1925
 Chlorophorus grosseri Sama & Rapuzzi, 2011
 Chlorophorus hainanicus Gressitt, 1940
 Chlorophorus hariolus Viktora, 2019
 Chlorophorus hauseri Pic, 1931
 Chlorophorus hederatus Heller, 1926
 Chlorophorus hefferni Dauber, 2002
 Chlorophorus henriettae Holzschuh, 1984
 Chlorophorus hircanus (Pic, 1905)
 Chlorophorus hirsutulus Gressitt & Rondon, 1970
 Chlorophorus hovorkai Schmid, 2015
 Chlorophorus hrabovskyi Kratochvíl, 1985
 Chlorophorus hubenyi Viktora, 2019
 Chlorophorus huilaensis Schmid, 2015
 Chlorophorus hungaricus Seidlitz, 1891
 Chlorophorus ictericus Holzschuh, 1991
 Chlorophorus ignobilis (Bates, 1878)
 Chlorophorus impressithorax Pic, 1950
 Chlorophorus inhumeralis Pic, 1918
 Chlorophorus insidiosus Holzschuh, 1986
 Chlorophorus intactus Holzschuh, 1992
 Chlorophorus interneconnexus Pic, 1925
 Chlorophorus jacobsoni Schwarzer, 1926
 Chlorophorus javanus Pic, 1943
 Chlorophorus jendeki Holzschuh, 1992
 Chlorophorus jucundus Perroud 1855
 Chlorophorus juheli Adlbauer, 2003
 Chlorophorus kabateki Holzschuh, 1998
 Chlorophorus kanekoi Matsushita, 1941
 Chlorophorus kanoi Hayashi, 1963
 Chlorophorus karausi Viktora, 2021
 Chlorophorus kejvali Holzschuh, 2003
 Chlorophorus kinganus (Pic, 1903)
 Chlorophorus kobayashii Komiya, 1976
 Chlorophorus krantzi Gahan, 1904
 Chlorophorus kusamai Sato, 1999
 Chlorophorus latens Viktora, 2019
 Chlorophorus latus Dauber, 2010
 Chlorophorus lineatus Dauber, 2002
 Chlorophorus lingnanensis Gressitt, 1951
 Chlorophorus linsleyi Gressitt & Rondon, 1970
 Chlorophorus lituratus (Laporte & Gory, 1836)
 Chlorophorus ludens Gahan, 1894
 Chlorophorus luxatus (Pascoe, 1869)
 Chlorophorus macaumensis (Chevrolat, 1845)
 Chlorophorus malaccanus Pic, 1925
 Chlorophorus manillae Aurivillius, 1911
 Chlorophorus marginalis (Chevrolat, 1863)
 Chlorophorus masatakai Niisato & Karube, 2006
 Chlorophorus medanensis Pic, 1925
 Chlorophorus mediolineatus Pic, 1925
 Chlorophorus melancholicus Chevrolat, 1906
 Chlorophorus micheli Pic, 1950
 Chlorophorus minamiiwo Satô & Ohbayashi, 1982
 Chlorophorus minutus Aurivillius, 1922
 Chlorophorus mjoebergii Aurivillius, 1917
 Chlorophorus moestus Chevrolat, 1863
 Chlorophorus monachus Viktora, 2020
 Chlorophorus montanus (Nonfried, 1894)
 Chlorophorus moultoni Aurivillius, 1911
 Chlorophorus moupinensis (Fairmaire, 1888)
 Chlorophorus muscifluvis Gressitt, 1951
 Chlorophorus mushanus (Bates, 1873)
 Chlorophorus namibiensis Adlbauer & Dauber, 1999
 Chlorophorus navratili Holzschuh, 1981
 Chlorophorus nepalensis Hayashi, 1979
 Chlorophorus niehuisi Adlbauer, 1992
 Chlorophorus nigerrimus (Chevrolat, 1863)
 Chlorophorus nivipictus (Kraatz, 1879)
 Chlorophorus nodai Makihara, 1986
 Chlorophorus nouphati Gressitt & Rondon, 1970
 Chlorophorus obliteratus (Ganglbauer, 1889)
 Chlorophorus oezdikmeni Sama & Rapuzzi, 2011
 Chlorophorus optabilis Viktora, 2019
 Chlorophorus orbatus Holzschuh, 1991
 Chlorophorus palavanicus Aurivillius, 1922
 Chlorophorus parens Allard, 1894
 Chlorophorus patricius (Gahan, 1906)
 Chlorophorus pelleteri (Laporte & Gory, 1836)
 Chlorophorus perornatus Jordan, 1894
 Chlorophorus perroti Fuchs, 1966
 Chlorophorus petaini Pic, 1943
 Chlorophorus pinguis Holzschuh, 1992
 Chlorophorus praecanus Holzschuh, 2006
 Chlorophorus praetextus (Pascoe, 1869)
 Chlorophorus proannulatus Gressitt & Rondon, 1970
 Chlorophorus probsti Holzschuh, 1989
 Chlorophorus procus Viktora, 2019
 Chlorophorus prodromus Viktora, 2020
 Chlorophorus pseudoswatensis Holzschuh, 1983
 Chlorophorus quatuordecimmaculatus (Chevrolat, 1863)
 Chlorophorus rectefasciatus Dauber, 2012
 Chlorophorus ringenbachi Sama, 2004
 Chlorophorus ringleticus Viktora, 2019
 Chlorophorus robustior (Pic, 1900)
 Chlorophorus rotundicollis Dauber, 2010
 Chlorophorus rubricollis (Laporte & Gory, 1836)
 Chlorophorus ruficornis (Olivier, 1790)
 Chlorophorus rufimembris Gressitt & Rondon, 1970
 Chlorophorus sagittarius Gahan, 1906
 Chlorophorus salicicola Holzschuh, 1993
 Chlorophorus salomonum (Aurivillius, 1908)
 Chlorophorus sappho Gressitt & Rondon, 1970
 Chlorophorus savuensis Viktora, 2020
 Chlorophorus scenicus (Pascoe, 1869)
 Chlorophorus scriptus (Dalman in Schoenherr, 1817)
 Chlorophorus seclusus (Pascoe, 1869)
 Chlorophorus semiformosus Pic, 1908
 Chlorophorus semikanoi Hayashi, 1974
 Chlorophorus seniculus Holzschuh, 2006
 Chlorophorus separatus Gressitt, 1940
 Chlorophorus sexguttatus (Lucas, 1849)
 Chlorophorus shoreae Gardner, 1941
 Chlorophorus siegriedae Holzschuh, 1993
 Chlorophorus signaticollis (Laporte & Gory, 1836)
 Chlorophorus signatipennis Gahan, 1907
 Chlorophorus smithi Gressitt, 1941
 Chlorophorus socius (Gahan, 1906)
 Chlorophorus sollicitus Viktora, 2019
 Chlorophorus sparsus (Reitter, 1886)
 Chlorophorus strobilicola Champion, 1918
 Chlorophorus sulcaticeps (Pic, 1924)
 Chlorophorus sumatrensis (Laporte & Gory, 1836)
 Chlorophorus sumbavae Aurivillius, 1911
 Chlorophorus swatensis Holzschuh, 1974
 Chlorophorus t-nigrum Jordan, 1894
 Chlorophorus taihorensis Schwarzer, 1925
 Chlorophorus taiwanus Matsushita, 1933
 Chlorophorus tixieri (Pic, 1902)
 Chlorophorus tohokensis Hayashi, 1968
 Chlorophorus tonkineus Fairmaire, 1895
 Chlorophorus torquilla Pascoe, 1869
 Chlorophorus touzalini Pic, 1920
 Chlorophorus tredecimmaculatus (Chevrolat, 1836)
 Chlorophorus trifasciatus (Fabricius, 1781)
 Chlorophorus trivialis Holzschuh, 2010
 Chlorophorus trusmadensis Dauber, 2006
 Chlorophorus tsitoensis (Fairmaire, 1888)
 Chlorophorus undosus Viktora, 2014
 Chlorophorus ursus Viktora, 2020
 Chlorophorus varius (Muller, 1766)
 Chlorophorus vartianae Holzschuh, 1974
 Chlorophorus vehemens Holzschuh, 2009
 Chlorophorus verus Holzschuh, 1998
 Chlorophorus vicinus Dauber, 2002
 Chlorophorus viridulus Kano, 1933
 Chlorophorus viticis Gressitt & Rondon, 1970
 Chlorophorus vulpinus Holzschuh, 1992
 Chlorophorus werneri Adlbauer & Bjornstad, 2012
 Chlorophorus wewalkai Holzschuh, 1969
 Chlorophorus yachovi Sama, 1996
 Chlorophorus yakitai Niisato, 2005
 Chlorophorus yamdenaensis Viktora, 2020
 Chlorophorus yayeyamensis Kano, 1933
 Chlorophorus yedoensis (Kano, 1933)
 Chlorophorus zelus Holzschuh, 1989
 Chlorophorus ziczac Holzschuh, 2017

References

External links
 Biolib
 Cerambycoidea

Clytini